Software-defined networking (SDN) is a marketing term which refers to software to configure and operate computer networks (especially data center networks) through a centralized software controller that dictates how the network behaves. The core of this new paradigm is the SDN controller.

There are typically two sets of SDN controllers:
 SDN controllers for the network function virtualization (NFV) of a datacenter,
 SDN controllers for managing the programmable switches of a network.

In case of SDN controllers for the NFV Infrastructure of a datacenter, they are mostly designed to provide some policy and centralized managements for the Openstack Neutron networking layer that will provide inter-working between the virtual ports created by Nova. The  technology of SDN controllers is to manage the Linux kernel features made of L3 IP routing, Linux bridges, iptables or ebtables, network namespaces and Open vSwitch.

Open and community-driven initiatives
Some promotional links to be removed:
Beacon
 Faucet 
 lighty-core
 Cherry
 NOX/POX
 ONOS
 Open vSwitch
 Tungsten
 OpenDaylight (controller baseline project, upon which many other controllers are built)
 OpenKilda
Project Calico
 Floodlight
 RUNOS
 Ryu Controller
The Fast Data Project
vneio/sdnc

Vendor Specific Initiatives 
lighty.io by PANTHEON.tech
 Nuage Virtualized Services Controller (VSC) by Nokia
 SEL-5056 by Schweitzer Engineering Laboratories
 VortiQa Open Network Director by Freescale Semiconductor

References

Configuration management
Lists of software